St Alban's Church is a Grade II listed Gothic Revival Anglican church in the Charminster area of Bournemouth, Dorset, England. The church stands across Charminster Road from the Church of the Annunciation.

History 
The church was designed by George Fellowes Prynne and built as a mother church of St Augustin's Church. The foundation stone was laid on 8 October 1907, and the church was opened on 3 June 1909.

The building is currently occupied and used by Coastline Vineyard, a charismatic church belonging to the Vineyard Movement.

Gallery

References

See also 

 List of churches in Bournemouth

Edwardian architecture
Grade II listed churches in Dorset
Church of England church buildings in Dorset
Churches in Bournemouth
Gothic Revival church buildings in England
Gothic Revival architecture in Dorset
Churches completed in 1909
1909 establishments in England